Comparison of ranks and insignia of all current and former space forces, to include aerospace forces and air and space forces.

Ranks

Officers

Enlisted

Former ranks

Officers

Enlisted

Insignia

Flags

Emblems

See also 
 List of space forces
 Ranks and insignia of NATO
 Ranks and insignia of marine forces

References

Military comparisons